Jorge "La Chancha" Rinaldi (born 23 March 1963 in Buenos Aires) is a former Argentine footballer. He played for a number of clubs in Argentina, Spain and Turkey and represented the Argentina national football team at international level.

Rinaldi started his professional career with San Lorenzo in 1980 at the age of 17. In 1982, he helped the club to win the Argentine 2nd division and gain promotion back to the Argentine Primera.

In 1985, he joined Sporting de Gijón in Spain but things did not work out for him there and he returned to Argentina in early 1986 to play for Boca Juniors.

In 1988 Rinaldi was sold directly to Boca's fiercest rivals, River Plate making him one of a select band of players to have played for Boca and River.

After one season with River, Rinaldi joined Gençlerbirliği S.K. in Turkey. In 1990, he returned to Argentina and his first club, San Lorenzo, in 1992 it became clear that he was no longer part of the managers plans and he took the difficult decision to retire at the age of only 28.

Since retirement Rinaldi has held several coaching positions including youth coach and caretaker manager at San Lorenzo and worked as a journalist for Clarín.

His son Leonel Rinaldi is also a footballer.

Honours
 San Lorenzo
Argentine 2nd division: 1982

External links

 Jorge Rinaldi at BDFA.com.ar 
 Museo de San Lorenzo profile 
 
 

1963 births
Living people
Footballers from Buenos Aires
Argentine people of Italian descent
Argentine footballers
Association football forwards
San Lorenzo de Almagro footballers
Sporting de Gijón players
Boca Juniors footballers
Club Atlético River Plate footballers
Gençlerbirliği S.K. footballers
Argentine Primera División players
La Liga players
Süper Lig players
Argentine expatriate footballers
Expatriate footballers in Spain
Expatriate footballers in Turkey
Argentina international footballers
1983 Copa América players
Argentine football managers
San Lorenzo de Almagro managers